Freshwater Creek is a small rural community in the Surf Coast Shire, Victoria, Australia. In the 2016 census, Freshwater Creek had a population of 414 people.

The community comprises farming and rural properties, with a small township on the Anglesea Road and Dickins Road. The township has several shops and a cafe. The community volunteer CFA building is located on Dickins Road. Alongside is the Community Hall, tennis courts, BBQ, public toilets and playground. The Freshwater Creek Riding Club is next door to the Community Hall with their cross country course along Duneed Creek. Opposite is Red Gum Run Arena Polo. The Revival Centre Church Camp is located behind the service station. The Freshwater Creek Steiner School is located on McIntyres Road. Not for profit, food recycling composting organisation City Harvest is co-located at The Farmers Place.

Freshwater Creek Post Office opened on 21 January 1860, was provisionally closed on 25 January 1961, and closed on 25 March 1961.

A school was opened at Freshwater Creek in 1856 as a Wesleyan denominational school. It became a department school State School No. 256 with the introduction of state schools in 1883. A new weatherboard building was opened at the same time, following the bluestone building from 1856. The school's honour roll from World War I is now located in the Community Hall and is listed on the Victorian War Heritage Inventory. In 1994, Freshwater Creek, Connewarre and Mt Duneed Primary Schools were amalgamated at Mt Duneed.The Freshwater Creek school building was moved to the Waurn Ponds Campus of Deakin University where it formed part of a collection of historic Australian buildings. It remained there for some years and then moved to Mt Duneed Primary School as an extra classroom. A new independent school within the township, Freshwater Creek Steiner School, opened on a different site in 2000.

St David's Lutheran Church and Cemetery, located on Anglesea Road, is a historic church which is both listed on the Victorian Heritage Register and classified by the National Trust of Australia. The current bluestone church dates from 1866, although a prior church had existed on the site since 1859. The church has a strong association with the early German pioneers who settled in the area, and the attached churchyard cemetery has historical significance as one of the few in the state to still survive. Services are still held at the church on the 3rd Sunday of every month, run by St Paul's Lutheran Church in Grovedale, which was designed by the same architect.

During the early 1970s Freshwater Creek School Headmaster was Graham Brown who had 4 children - Phillip, Noel, Helen and Wendy.
Wendy went to Oberon High School and after a brief marriage to Michael Harmer from Geelong, became the famous comedienne Wendy Harmer.

References

Towns in Victoria (Australia)
Surf Coast Shire